The 1886 North Monaghan by-election was a parliamentary by-election held for the United Kingdom House of Commons constituency of North Monaghan on 10 February 1886. Tim Healy of the Irish Parliamentary Party had won the seat in the  general election of 1885, but having been elected also in South Londonderry, he chose to sit for the latter. The North Monaghan seat thus became vacant, and in the ensuing by-election, Patrick O'Brien of the Irish Parliamentary Party was elected, defeating his Conservative opponent, Dr Hall, by 4,015 votes to 2,551, a slightly increased majority from the general election.

References 

1886 elections in the United Kingdom
By-elections to the Parliament of the United Kingdom in County Monaghan constituencies
1886 elections in Ireland